Kent League may refer to:

Southern Counties East Football League, known as the Kent League until 2013
Kent Football League (1894–1959), an earlier league
Kent Cricket League